Belá may refer to:

Places in Slovakia
 Belá, Nové Zámky District, a municipality and village
 Belá, Žilina District, a village and municipality
 Belá (river)

Other uses
 Belá (ballet), choreographed by Tim Rushton

See also
 Bela (disambiguation)
 Béla (disambiguation)
 Bělá (disambiguation)
 Banská Belá, a village and municipality in Banská Štiavnica District, Banská Bystrica Region, Slovakia
 Spišská Belá, a town in Kežmarok District, Prešov Region, Slovakia